Wildwood is an unincorporated community in Santa Cruz County, California, United States.

References

Unincorporated communities in Santa Cruz County, California
Unincorporated communities in California